Polysulfide reductase (NrfD) is an integral transmembrane protein with loops in both the periplasm and the cytoplasm. NrfD is thought to participate in the transfer of electrons, from the quinone pool into the terminal components of the Nrf pathway.

References

Protein families